Curt "Curre" Richard Lincoln (8 October 1918 in Stockholm – 28 August 2005 in Espoo) was one of the most famous race car drivers in Finland, who also played Davis Cup tennis for Finland.

Early life
Born in Stockholm, Sweden, Lincoln moved to Helsinki, Finland, as a child with his family in 1926. He was one of the Swedish volunteers who fought for Finland in World War II. Lincoln served as a transport driver in the 10th Division in the Continuation War.

Racing career
Lincoln's racing career started with hydroplanes in 1947. In 1949 he changed to a 500 cc Effyh, later he also drove cars such as Jaguar D types, Ferraris and Formula 3 Coopers. During his career he drove around 400 races and had around 200 wins. He won 14 Finnish Eläintarha races between 1951 and 1962 in the Formula 3 and Junior classes. Other wins were the GP of Angola and two class wins at the Swedish GP in Kristianstad. He was also one of the organisers when Keimola Motor Stadium was built in Finland. He had his last win in 1967 with F3 Brabham BT 21 at Keimola and retired from racing in the next year.

Tennis career
Lincoln was also a top level tennis player, being Finnish and Swedish Champion. Lincoln represented Finland during the 1954 Davis Cup Europe Zone first round tie against Norway, played in Helsinki. He played in the doubles rubber with partner Sakari Salo and lost in four sets to Nils-Erik Hessen and Rolf Pape.

Personal
Curt Lincoln became a Finnish Citizen in 1961. His daughter Nina was married to Formula One World Champion Jochen Rindt.

He is buried in the Hietaniemi Cemetery in Helsinki.

See also
List of Finland Davis Cup team representatives

References

External links

 
 
 

Finnish racing drivers
Swedish people of English descent
Finnish people of Swedish descent
Finnish people of English descent
1918 births
2005 deaths
Burials at Hietaniemi Cemetery
Finnish male tennis players
Naturalized citizens of Finland
Swedish emigrants to Finland
Volunteers in the Winter War